Paulo Rocha may refer to:

 Paulo Rocha (actor) (born 1977), Portuguese actor
 Paulo Rocha (Brazilian politician) (born 1951), Brazilian politician
Paulo Rocha (Cape Verde politician)
 Paulo Rocha (film director) (1935–2012), Portuguese film director
 Paulo Sérgio Rocha (born 1978), Brazilian footballer
 Paulo Rocha (footballer, born 1954), Portuguese footballer